Click here for Karan Thakur (Actor).

Karan Thakur (born 28 September 1992) is an Indian cricketer . In November 2013, at a BCCI under-25 match against Baroda at the Reliance Cricket Stadium, he took all 10 wickets in the innings.

He made his first-class debut for Railways in the 2016–17 Ranji Trophy on 27 October 2016. He made his List A debut for Railways in the 2017–18 Vijay Hazare Trophy on 10 February 2018.

References

External links
 

1992 births
Living people
Indian cricketers
Railways cricketers
Cricketers from Himachal Pradesh
People from Manali, Himachal Pradesh